"That's My Job" is a song written by Gary Burr, and recorded by American country music artist Conway Twitty.  It was released in November 1987 as the third single from the album Borderline.  The song reached #6 on the Billboard Hot Country Singles & Tracks chart.

Charts

Weekly charts

Year-end charts

Certifications

References

1988 singles
1987 songs
Conway Twitty songs
Songs written by Gary Burr
Song recordings produced by Jimmy Bowen
MCA Records singles